Simon Lui Yue Yeung (born 8 July 1964), also known as Simon Loui and Simon Yu, is a highly prolific Hong Kong-based actor famous for starring in many low-budget and/or horror films since the early 1990s. He began drawing attention when he was featured in the "Troublesome Night" movie series. He starred in 27 films in 1999 alone, and began writing scripts the same year, starting with Last Ghost Standing.

Filmography
Dragon Action Secret Code (2019)
A Beautiful Moment (2018)
Paris Holiday (2015)
Vulgaria (2012)
Feel It Say It... (2006)
Loss Of Memory (2006)
The Corpse Spirit Is Pressing (2005)
A Knife-Shooter (2005)
Escape from Hong Kong Island (2004) {Director}
Herbal Tea (2004) Producer, Writer, Actor
I.T. Story (2004) Actor
Super Model (2004) Actor
Troublesome Night 19 (2003)
Troublesome Night 18 (2003)
Happy Family (2002) Actor
Troublesome Night 17 (2002)
Troublesome Night 16 (2002)
Troublesome Night 9 (2001)
Conspiracy (2000)
Troublesome Night 8 (2000)
Troublesome Night 7 (2000)
Last Ghost Standing (1999) - Yang Yang
Troublesome Night 6 (1999)
Troublesome Night 5 (1999)
The Doctor in Spite of Himself (1999)
Troublesome Night 4 (1998)
Troublesome Night 3 (1998)
Troublesome Night 2 (1997)
Troublesome Night (1997)
 Banana Club (1996) - Yue Yeung

References

External links

Love HKFilm entry
Simon Lui Interview - April 2005
HK cinemagic entry

1964 births
Living people
Hong Kong male film actors
20th-century Hong Kong male actors
21st-century Hong Kong male actors
Hong Kong television presenters
Hong Kong radio presenters
Hong Kong film directors
Hong Kong people of English descent